The Rund um Sebnitz is a one-day cycling race held annually in Germany. It has been part of UCI Europe Tour since 2015 in category 1.2.

Winners

References

External links

Cycle races in Germany
1954 establishments in Germany
Recurring sporting events established in 1954
UCI Europe Tour races